Lake Agnes may refer to:

 Lake Agnes (Alberta) in Banff National Park, Alberta, Canada
 Lake Agnes (Colorado) in Colorado, United States
 Lake Agnes (Florida) in Florida, United States, site of Fantasy_of_flight
 Lake Agnes (Minnesota)
Lake Agnes (New Zealand), a mountain lake near the Hollyford Valley, in the South Island of New Zealand
 Lake Agnes in the Hunter Island region of the Quetico Provincial Park, northern Ontario, Canada.